Ostay-ye Sofla (also Romanized as Ostāy-ye Soflá; also known as Ostā-ye Pā’īn and Ostāy-ye Pā’īn) is a village in Jannatabad Rural District, Salehabad County, Razavi Khorasan Province, Iran. At the 2006 census, its population was 413, in 81 families.

References 

Populated places in   Torbat-e Jam County